Publius Cornelius Scipio Africanus (236/235–183 BC) was a Roman general and statesman, most notable as one of the main architects of Rome's victory against Carthage in the Second Punic War. Often regarded as one of the greatest military commanders and strategists of all time, his greatest military achievement was the defeat of Hannibal at the Battle of Zama in 202 BC. This victory in Africa earned him the epithet Africanus, literally meaning "the African," but meant to be understood as a conqueror of Africa.

Scipio's conquest of Carthaginian Iberia culminated in the Battle of Ilipa in 206 BC against Hannibal's brother Mago Barca. Although considered a hero by the Roman people, primarily for his victories against Carthage, Scipio had many opponents, especially Cato the Elder, who hated him deeply. In 187 BC, he was tried in a show trial alongside his brother for bribes they supposedly received from the Seleucid king Antiochos III during the Roman–Seleucid War. Disillusioned by the ingratitude of his peers, Scipio left Rome and retired from public life at his villa in Liternum.

Early years

Publius Cornelius Scipio was born by Caesarean section into the family of the Cornelii Scipiones. His birth year is calculated from statements made by ancient historians (mainly Livy and Polybius) of how old he was when certain events in his life occurred and must have been 236/5 BC, usually stated as circa 236 BC.

The Cornelii were one of six major patrician families, along with the gentes Manlia, Fabia, Aemilia, the Claudia, and Valeria, with a record of successful public service in the highest offices extending back at least to the early Roman Republic.

Scipio's great-grandfather, Lucius Cornelius Scipio Barbatus, and grandfather Lucius Cornelius Scipio, had both been consuls and censors. He was the eldest son of the consul Publius Cornelius Scipio by his wife Pomponia, daughter of plebeian consul Manius Pomponius Matho.

Scipio was a member of the Salii, the college of priests of Mars.

Early military service
Scipio joined the Roman struggle against Carthage in the first year of the Second Punic War when his father was consul. During the Battle of Ticinus, he saved his father's life by "charging the encircling force alone with reckless daring."

He survived the disaster at the Battle of Cannae, where his would-be father-in-law, the consul Lucius Aemilius Paullus, was killed.  After the battle, with the other consul surviving elsewhere, Scipio and Appius Claudius Pulcher, as military tribunes, took charge of some 10,360 survivors.  On hearing that Lucius Caecilius Metellus and other young nobles were planning to go overseas to serve some king, Scipio stormed into the meeting, and at sword-point, forced all present to swear that they would not abandon Rome.

Scipio offered himself as a candidate for aedilis curulis in 213 BC alongside his cousin Marcus Cornelius Cethegus. The Tribunate of the Plebs objected to his candidacy, saying that he could not be allowed to stand because he had not yet reached the legal age. Scipio, already known for his bravery and patriotism, was elected unanimously and the Tribunes abandoned their opposition. His cousin also won the election.

Campaign in Hispania
 

In 211 BC, both Scipio's father, Publius Scipio, and uncle, Gnaeus Cornelius Scipio Calvus, were killed at the Battle of the Upper Baetis in Spain against Hannibal's brother, Hasdrubal Barca. At the election of a new proconsul for the command of the new army which the Romans resolved to send to Hispania, Scipio was the only man brave enough to ask for this position, no other candidates wanting the responsibility, considering it a death sentence. In spite of his youth (25 years), his noble demeanour and enthusiastic language had made so great an impression that he was unanimously elected. In the year of Scipio's arrival (211 BC), all of Hispania south of the Ebro river was under Carthaginian control. Hannibal's brothers Hasdrubal and Mago, and Hasdrubal Gisco were the generals of the Carthaginian forces in Hispania, and Rome was aided by the inability of these three figures to act in concert. The Carthaginians were also preoccupied with revolts in Africa.

Scipio landed at the mouth of the Ebro and captured Carthago Nova (New Carthage), the headquarters of the Carthaginian power in Hispania. He obtained a rich cache of war stores and supplies and an excellent harbour and base of operations. Scipio's humanitarian conduct toward prisoners and hostages in Hispania helped in portraying the Romans as liberators as opposed to conquerors. Livy tells the story of his troops capturing a beautiful woman, whom they offered to Scipio as a prize of war. Scipio was astonished by her beauty but discovered that the woman was betrothed to a Celtiberian chieftain named Allucius. He returned the woman to her fiancé, along with the money that had been offered by her parents to ransom her. This humanitarian act encouraged local chieftains to both supply and reinforce Scipio's small army. The woman's fiancé, who soon married her, responded by bringing over his tribe to support the Roman armies.

In 208 BC, Scipio fought his first set piece battle, driving back Hasdrubal Barca from his position at Baecula on the upper Guadalquivir. Scipio feared that the armies of Mago and Gisco would enter the field and surround his small army. Scipio's objective was, therefore, to quickly eliminate one of the armies to give him the luxury of dealing with the other two piecemeal. The battle was decided by a determined Roman infantry charge up the centre of the Carthaginian position. Roman losses are uncertain but may have been considerable in light of an effort by the infantry to scale an elevation defended by Carthaginian light infantry. Scipio then orchestrated a frontal attack by the rest of his infantry to draw out the remainder of the Carthaginian forces.

Hasdrubal had not noticed Scipio's hidden reserves of cavalry moving behind enemy lines, and a Roman cavalry charge created a double envelopment on either flank led by cavalry commander Gaius Laelius and Scipio himself. This broke the back of Hasdrubal's army and routed his forces—an impressive feat for the young Roman versus the veteran Carthaginian general. Despite a Roman victory, Scipio was unable to hinder the Carthaginian march to Italy. Much historical criticism has been levelled at his inability to effectively pursue Hasdrubal, who would eventually cross the Alps only to be defeated by Gaius Claudius Nero at the Battle of the Metaurus.

One popular theory for Scipio's failure to pursue Hasdrubal is that Scipio merely wanted the glory of securing Hispania, and an extended mountain campaign would have endangered that. Others cite the Roman soldiers' appetite for plunder as preventing him from rallying in pursuit. The most probable explanation from a strategic standpoint is Scipio's unwillingness to risk being trapped between Hasdrubal's army on one side and one or both of Gisgo's and Mago's armies, both of superior numerical strength. Mere days after Hasdrubal's defeat, Mago and Gisgo were able to converge in front of the Roman positions, bringing into question what would have happened had Scipio pursued Hasdrubal.

After winning over a number of Hispanian chiefs (namely Indibilis and Mandonius), Scipio achieved a decisive victory in 206 BC over the full Carthaginian levy at Ilipa (now the city of Alcalá del Río, near Hispalis, now called Seville), which resulted in the evacuation of Hispania by the Punic commanders.

After his rapid success in conquering Hispania, and with the idea of striking a blow at Carthage in Africa, Scipio paid a short visit to the Numidian princes Syphax and Massinissa. Numidia was of vital importance to Carthage, supplying both mercenaries and allied forces. In addition to supplying the Numidian cavalry (on which see the Battle of Cannae), Numidia operated as a buffer for vulnerable Carthage. Scipio managed to receive support from both Syphax and Massinissa. Syphax later changed his mind, married the beautiful Carthaginian noblewoman Sophonisba, daughter of Hasdrubal the son of Gisco, and fought alongside his Carthaginian in-laws against Massinissa and Scipio in Africa.

In circa 206 BC Scipio founded the settlement of Italica 9 km northwest of Seville in southern Spain, in the province of Hispania Baetica. It became the birthplace of Roman Emperors Trajan, Hadrian, and Theodosius (possibly).

On his return to Hispania, Scipio had to quell a mutiny at Sucro which had broken out among his troops.  Hannibal's brother Hasdrubal had meanwhile marched for Italy, and in 206 BC Scipio himself, having secured the Roman occupation of Hispania by the capture of Gades, gave up his command and returned to Rome.

African campaign

In 205 BC, Scipio was unanimously elected to consulship at the age of 31. Scipio intended to go to Africa, but due to the envy of others in the Senate, he was not given any additional troops beyond the Sicilian garrison. Despite this resistance, Scipio gathered resources from clients and supporters in Rome and among the Italian communities; this allowed him to muster a volunteer force of 30 warships and 7000 men.

The forces stationed in Sicily at this time included a variety of forces. The Romans had for a long time used service in Sicily as a punishment, with the result that the garrison in Sicily contained survivors from many of the greatest Roman military fiascos in the war, such as the Battle of Cannae. Having served with these men at Cannae, Scipio was well aware that their disgrace was through no fault of their own. In addition, the Sicilian garrison also contained many of the troops who had participated in the Sicilian campaigns of Marcus Claudius Marcellus. From these men, Scipio was able to muster a highly motivated and very experienced force for his African invasion. Scipio turned Sicily into a camp for training his army.

Scipio realized that the Carthaginian forces—especially the superior Numidian cavalry—would prove decisive against the largely infantry forces of the Roman legions. In addition, a large portion of Rome's cavalry were allies of questionable loyalty, or noble equites exempting themselves from being lowly foot soldiers. One anecdote tells of how Scipio pressed into service several hundred Sicilian nobles to create a cavalry force. The Sicilians were quite opposed to this servitude to a foreign occupier (Sicily being under Roman control only since the First Punic War), and protested vigorously. Scipio assented to their exemption from service providing they pay for a horse, equipment, and a replacement rider for the Roman army. In this way, Scipio created a trained nucleus of cavalry for his African campaign.

The Roman Senate sent a commission of inquiry to Sicily and found Scipio at the head of a well-equipped and trained fleet and army.  Scipio pressed the Senate for permission to cross into Africa. Some of the Roman Senate, championed by Quintus Fabius Maximus Verrucosus Cunctator ("the Delayer"), opposed the mission. Fabius still feared Hannibal's power and viewed any mission to Africa as dangerous and wasteful to the war effort. Scipio was also harmed by some senators' disdain of his ideals, beliefs, and interests in unconventional areas such as Hellenophile tastes in art, luxuries, and philosophies. All Scipio could obtain was permission to cross over from Sicily to Africa if it appeared to be in the interests of Rome, but not financial or military support.

With permission from the commissioners, Scipio sailed in 204 BC and landed near Utica. Carthage, meanwhile, had secured the friendship of the Numidian Syphax, whose advance compelled Scipio to abandon the siege of Utica and dig in on the shore between there and Carthage. In 203 BC, he destroyed the combined armies of the Carthaginians and Numidians by approaching by stealth and setting fire to their camp, where the combined army became panicked and fled when they were mostly killed by Scipio's army. Though it was not a "battle," both Polybius and Livy estimate that the death toll in this single attack exceeded 40,000 Carthaginian and Numidian dead, and more captured.

Historians are roughly equal in their praise and condemnation of this act. Polybius said, "of all the brilliant exploits performed by Scipio this seems to me the most brilliant and more adventurous." On the other hand, one of Hannibal's principal biographers, Theodore Ayrault Dodge, goes so far as to suggest that this attack was out of cowardice and spares no more than a page upon the event in total, despite the fact that it secured the siege of Utica and effectively put Syphax out of the war. The irony of Dodge's accusations of Scipio's cowardice is that the attack showed traces of Hannibal's penchant for ambush.

Scipio quickly dispatched his two lieutenants, Gaius Laelius and Masinissa, to pursue Syphax. They ultimately dethroned Syphax and ensured Prince Masinissa's coronation as King of the Numidians. Carthage, and especially Hannibal himself, had long relied upon these superb natural horsemen, who would now fight for Rome against Carthage.

War with Hannibal, the Battle of Zama

Now deserted by its allies and surrounded by a veteran and undefeated Roman army, Carthage began opening diplomatic channels for negotiation. At the same time, Hannibal Barca and his army were recalled to Carthage, and despite the moderate terms offered to Carthage by Scipio, Carthage suddenly suspended negotiations and again prepared for war. The army that Hannibal returned with is a subject of much debate. Advocates for Hannibal often claim that his army was mostly Italians pressed into service from southern Italy and that most of his elite veterans (and certainly cavalry) were spent. Scipio's advocates tend to be far more suspicious and believe the number of veteran forces to remain significant.

Hannibal had a trained pool of soldiers who had fought in Italy, as well as eighty war elephants. Hannibal could boast a strength of around forty thousand: 36,000 infantry and 4,000 cavalry, compared to Scipio's 29,000 infantry and 6,100 cavalry. The two generals met on a plain between Carthage and Utica on October 19, 202 BC, at the final Battle of Zama. Despite mutual admiration, negotiations floundered due largely to Roman distrust of the Carthaginians as a result of the Carthaginian attack on Saguntum, the breach of protocols that ended the First Punic War (known as Punic Faith), and a perceived breach in contemporary military etiquette due to Hannibal's numerous ambushes.

Hannibal arranged his infantry in three phalangial lines designed to overlap the Roman lines. His tactics, so often reliant upon subtlety, were simple: a massive forward attack by the war elephants would create gaps in the Roman lines, which would be exploited by the infantry, supported by the cavalry.

Rather than arranging his forces in the traditional manipular lines, which put the hastati, principes, and triarii in succeeding lines parallel to the enemy's line, Scipio instead put the maniples in lines perpendicular to the enemy, a stratagem designed to counter the war elephants. When the Carthaginian elephants charged, they found well-laid traps before the Roman position and were greeted by Roman trumpeters, which drove back many out of confusion and fear. In addition, many elephants were goaded harmlessly through the loose ranks by the velites and other skirmishers. 

Roman javelins were used to good effect, and the sharp traps caused further disorder among the elephants. Many of them were so distraught that they charged back into their own lines. The Roman infantry was greatly rattled by the elephants, but Massinissa's Numidian and Laelius' Roman cavalry began to drive the opposing cavalry off the field. Both cavalry commanders pursued their routing Carthaginian counterparts, leaving the Carthaginian and Roman infantries to engage one another. The resulting infantry clash was fierce and bloody, with neither side achieving local superiority. 

The Roman infantry had driven off the two front lines of the Carthaginian army, and in the respite took an opportunity to drink water. The Roman army was then drawn up in one long line (as opposed to the traditional three lines) in order to match the length of Hannibal's line. Scipio's army then marched towards Hannibal's veterans, who had not yet taken part in the battle. The final struggle was bitter and won only when the allied cavalry rallied and returned to the battlefield. Charging the rear of Hannibal's army, they caused what many historians have called the "Roman Cannae".

Many Roman aristocrats, especially Cato, expected Scipio to raze that city to the ground after his victory. However, Scipio dictated extremely moderate terms in contrast to an immoderate Roman Senate. While the security of Rome was guaranteed by demands such as the surrender of the fleet, and a lasting tribute was to be paid, the strictures were sufficiently light for Carthage to regain its full prosperity. With Scipio's consent, Hannibal was allowed to become the civic leader of Carthage, which the Cato family did not forget.

Return to Rome
Scipio was welcomed back to Rome in triumph with the agnomen of Africanus. He refused the many further honors that the people would have thrust upon him such as Consul for life and Dictator. In the year 199 BC, Scipio was elected Censor and for some years afterward he lived quietly and took no part in politics.

In 193 BC, Scipio was one of the commissioners sent to Africa to settle a dispute between Massinissa and the Carthaginians, which the commission did not achieve. This may have been because Hannibal, in the service of Antiochus III of Syria, might have come to Carthage to gather support for a new attack on Italy. In 190 BC, when the Romans declared war against Antiochus III, Publius offered to join his brother Lucius Cornelius Scipio Asiaticus if the Senate entrusted the chief command to him. The two brothers brought the war to a conclusion by a decisive victory at Magnesia in the same year.

Retirement

Scipio's political enemies, led by Cato the Censor, gained ground. When the Scipiones returned to Rome, two tribunes prosecuted (187 BC) Lucius on the grounds of misappropriation of money received from Antiochus. As Lucius was in the act of producing his account-books, his brother wrested them from his hands, tore them in pieces, and flung them on the floor of the Senate house. Scipio then allegedly asked the courts why they were concerned about how 3,000 talents had been spent and apparently unconcerned about how 15,000 talents were entering the state coffers (the tribute that Antiochus was paying Rome after his defeat by Lucius). This high-handed act shamed the prosecution, and it appears that the case against Lucius was dismissed, though Lucius would again be prosecuted, and this time convicted, after the death of Scipio.

Scipio himself was subsequently (185 BC) accused of having been bribed by Antiochus. By reminding the people that it was the anniversary of his victory at Zama, he caused an outburst of enthusiasm in his favor. The people crowded around him and followed him to the Capitol, where they offered thanks to the gods and begged them to give Rome more citizens like Scipio Africanus. Despite the popular support that Scipio commanded, there were renewed attempts to bring him to trial, but these appear to have been deflected by his future son-in-law, Tiberius Sempronius Gracchus. It is supposedly in gratitude for this act that Scipio betrothed his youngest daughter Cornelia (then aged about 5) to Gracchus, several decades her senior (however, no contemporaneous references to this event exist; what is known is that Gracchus did marry Cornelia, aged about 18, in 172 BC).

Death
Scipio retired to his country seat at Liternum on the coast of Campania. He lived there for the rest of his life, revealing his great magnanimity by attempting to prevent the ruin of the exiled Hannibal by Rome. He probably died in 183 BC (the actual year and date of his death remain unknown) aged about 53. His death is said to have taken place under suspicious circumstances, and it is possible that he either died of the lingering effects of the fever contracted while on campaign in 190 BC, or that he killed himself for causes unknown. 

He is said to have demanded that his body be buried away from his ungrateful city, and the writer Livy visited his tomb in Liternum more than 150 years later. However, it is not certain that he was actually buried at Liternum, and no contemporary accounts of his death or funeral exist. It is said that he ordered an inscription on his tomb: Ingrata patria, ne ossa quidem habebis ("ungrateful fatherland, you will not even have my bones").

Coincidentally, his great rival Hannibal died in Bithynia in the same year or shortly thereafter, also an exile (albeit far from his native city and not by his own decision), pursued and harassed to the end by Romans such as Titus Quinctius Flamininus.

Marriage and issue
With his wife Aemilia Tertia, daughter of the consul Lucius Aemilius Paullus who fell at Cannae and sister of another consul Lucius Aemilius Paullus Macedonicus, he had a happy and fruitful marriage. Aemilia had unusual freedom and wealth for a patrician married woman, and she was an important role model for many younger Roman women, just as her youngest daughter Cornelia, mother of the Gracchi, would be an important role model for many Late Republican Roman noblewomen, including allegedly the mother of Julius Caesar.

Scipio Africanus had two sons. The elder Publius Cornelius Scipio was appointed an augur in 180 BC; he never ran for office due to poor health.  The younger Lucius Cornelius Scipio became praetor in 174 BC, and was expelled from the Senate by the censors. The elder son Publius adopted his first cousin, his uncle Lucius Aemilius Paullus's second son, who received the name Publius Cornelius Scipio Aemilianus.

Scipio and Aemilia Paulla also had two surviving daughters. The elder, Cornelia, married her second cousin Publius Cornelius Scipio Nasica Corculum (son of the consul of 191 BC who was himself son of Scipio's elder paternal uncle Gnaeus Cornelius Scipio Calvus). This son-in-law was a distinguished Roman in his own right. He became consul (abdicating or resigning in 162 BC for religious reasons, then being re-elected in 155 BC), censor in 159 BC, Princeps Senatus, and died as Pontifex Maximus in 141 BC. Scipio Nasica rose to many of the dignities enjoyed by his late father-in-law, and was noted for his staunch (if ultimately futile) opposition to Cato the Censor over the fate of Carthage from about 157 to 149 BC. They had at least one surviving son (of whom more below).

The younger daughter was more famous in history; Cornelia, the young wife of the elderly Tiberius Sempronius Gracchus, tribune of the plebs, praetor, then consul 177 (then censor and consul again), became the mother of 12 children, the only surviving sons being the famous Tiberius Gracchus and Gaius Gracchus. All three surviving children of this union were ill-fated; the brothers Gracchi died relatively young, murdered or forced to commit suicide by more conservative relatives. 

The eldest child and only surviving daughter, Sempronia, was married to her mother's first cousin (and her own cousin by adoption) Scipio Aemilianus Africanus. The couple had no children, and Sempronia grew to hate her husband after he condoned the murder of her brother Tiberius in 132 BC. Scipio's mysterious death in 129 BC, at the age of 56, was blamed by some on his wife, and by others on his political rivals.

Scipio's only descendants living through the late Republican period were the descendants of his two daughters, his sons having died without legitimate surviving issue. His younger daughter's last surviving child Sempronia, wife and then widow of Scipio Aemilianus, was alive as late as 102 BC.

His other known grandson Publius Cornelius Scipio Nasica Serapio was far more conservative than his Gracchi cousins. He and his descendants all became increasingly conservative, in stark contrast to the father and grandfathers. Scipio Africanus's eldest grandson Publius Cornelius Scipio Nasica Serapio became consul in 138, murdered his own cousin Tiberius Sempronius Gracchus (163–132 BC) in 132. Scipio Nasica Serapio, although Pontifex Maximus was sent to Asia Minor by the Senate to escape the wrath of the Gracchi supporters, and died mysteriously there in Pergamum, and is believed to have been poisoned by an agent of the Gracchi.

Serapio's son, the fourth Scipio Nasica, was even more conservative, and rose to be consul in 111 BC. This Scipio Nasica's sons became praetors only shortly before the Marsic or Social War (starting 91 BC). However, a grandson (adopted into the plebeian-noble Caecilii Metelli) became the Metellus Scipio who allied himself with Pompey the Great and Cato the Younger, and who opposed Julius Caesar. Metellus Scipio was the last Scipio to distinguish himself militarily or politically.

None of Scipio's descendants, apart from Scipio Aemilianus—his wife's nephew who became his adoptive grandson—came close to matching his political career or his military successes.

Resting place

Archaeology has not yet determined the resting place of Scipio Africanus. The Tomb of the Scipios has been discovered and is open to the public, but it is not believed that Scipio Africanus was interred there. The possibility exists that he was returned to Rome and laid to rest there in a still undiscovered crypt. Livy says in his History of Rome that statues of Scipio Africanus, Lucius Scipio and the Roman poet Ennius (a friend of the family) were present at the Tomb of the Scipios when he visited it. 

However, Seneca (Epistle 86.1), having moved into the villa at Liternum that used to belong to Scipio Africanus, says that he has done "reverence to his [Africanus'] spirit and to an altar which I am inclined to think is the tomb of that great warrior". This suggests that it was known that Africanus was not buried inside Rome, and it is possible that his sarcophagus did indeed resemble an altar (although there is no direct evidence for this), given that the sarcophagus of Lucius Cornelius Scipio Barbatus, the "founder" of the Scipiones, which can be found in pride of place in the family tomb, is altar-like in style.

Another tradition has it that the ashes of Scipio Africanus were placed within the pyramidal Meta Romuli for a time, which resulted in that tomb being referred to as the Sepulcrum Scipionis during the Renaissance. According to Helenius Acron (in his commentaries on Horace), after receiving advice from an oracle, the ashes of Scipio were removed de pyramide in Vaticano constituta and from there reburied in a tomb placed between Ostia and Portus.

Lost sources
Scipio is said to have written his memoirs in Greek, but those are lost (perhaps destroyed) along with the history written by his elder son and namesake (adoptive father of Scipio Aemilianus) and his Life by Plutarch. As a result, contemporary accounts of his life, particularly his childhood and youth, are virtually non-existent. Even Plutarch's account of Scipio's life, written much later, has been lost. 

What remains are accounts of his doings in Polybius, Livy's Histories (which say little about his private life), supplemented with the surviving histories of Appian and Cassius Dio, and the odd anecdote in Valerius Maximus. Of these, Polybius was the closest to Scipio Africanus in age and in connections, but his narrative may be biased by his friendship with Scipio's close relatives and that the primary source of his information about Africanus came from one of his best friends, Gaius Laelius.

Roman opinions of Scipio
Scipio was a man of great intellect and culture who could speak and read Greek, wrote his own memoirs in Greek and became also noted for his introduction of the clean shaven face fashion among the Romans according to the example of Alexander the Great instead of wearing the beard. This man's fashion lasted until the time of emperor Hadrian (r. 117 - 138) and then was revived again by Constantine the Great (r. 306 - 337).
He also enjoyed the reputation of being a graceful orator, the secret of his sway being his deep self-confidence and radiant sense of fairness.

To his political opponents, he was often harsh and arrogant, but towards others singularly gracious and sympathetic. His Graecophile lifestyle, and his unconventional way of wearing the Roman toga, raised much opposition among some Senators of Rome, led by Cato the Elder who felt that Greek influence was destroying Roman culture. Cato, as a loyalist of Fabius Maximus, had been sent out as quaestor to Scipio in Sicily circa 204 BC to investigate charges of military indiscipline, corruption, and other offence against Scipio; none of those charges was found true by the tribunes of the plebs accompanying Cato (it may or may not be significant that years later, as censor, Cato degraded Scipio's brother Scipio Asiaticus from the Senate. It is certainly true that some Romans of the day viewed Cato as a representative of the old Romans, and Scipio and his like as Graecophiles).

He often visited the temple of Jupiter and made offerings there. There was a belief that he was a special favourite of heaven and actually communicated with the gods. It is quite possible that he himself honestly shared this belief. However, the strength of this belief is evident, even a generation later when his adopted grandson, Publius Aemilianus Scipio, was elected to the consulship from the office of tribune. His rise was spectacular and letters survive from soldiers under his command in Hispania show that they believed that he possessed the same abilities as his grandfather.

The elder Scipio was a spiritual man as well as a soldier and statesman, and was a priest of Mars. The ability which he is supposed to have possessed is called by the old name, "second sight", and he is supposed to have had prescient dreams in which he saw the future. Livy describes this belief as it was perceived then, without offering his opinion as to its veracity. Polybius made a case that Scipio's successes resulted from good planning, rational thinking and intelligence, which he said was a higher sign of the gods' favour than prophetic dreams. Polybius suggested that people had only said that Scipio had supernatural powers because they had not appreciated the natural mental gifts which facilitated Scipio's achievements.

The continence of Scipio

The Roman historian Valerius Maximus, writing in the first century AD, alleged that Scipio Africanus had a weakness for beautiful women, and knowing this, some of his soldiers presented him with a beautiful young woman captured in New Carthage. The woman turned out to be the fiancée of an important Iberian chieftain and Scipio chose to act as a general and not an ordinary soldier in restoring her, virtue and ransom intact, to her fiancé. This episode was frequently depicted by painters of the Renaissance and early modern era as the Continence of Scipio.

According to Valerius Maximus, Scipio had a relationship from circa 191 BC with one of his own serving girls, which his wife magnanimously overlooked. The affair, if it lasted from circa 191 BC to Scipio's death 183 BC, might have resulted in issue (not mentioned); what is mentioned is that the girl was freed by Aemilia Paulla after Scipio's death and married to one of his freedmen. This account is only found in Valerius Maximus (Memorable Deeds and Sayings 6.7.1–3. L) writing in the first century AD, some decades after Livy. Valerius Maximus is hostile to Scipio Africanus in other matters such as his frequent visits to the Temple of Jupiter Capitolinus, which Maximus saw as "fake religion."

Legacy

Military

Scipio is considered by many to be one of Rome's greatest generals; he never lost a battle. Skillful alike in strategy and in tactics, he had also the faculty of inspiring his soldiers with confidence. Livy reports that, as a Roman commissioner to Ephesus following the defeat of Antiochus III, on meeting the exiled Hannibal, Scipio took the opportunity to ask Hannibal's opinion of the "greatest commander," to which Hannibal named Alexander the Great as the first and Pyrrhus as the second.

Livy continues, "On Scipio's again asking him whom he regarded as the third, Hannibal, without any hesitation, replied, 'Myself.' Scipio smiled and asked, 'What would you say if you had vanquished me?' 'In that case,' replied Hannibal, 'I should say that I surpassed Alexander and Pyrrhus, and all other commanders in the world.' Scipio was delighted with the turn which the speaker had with true Carthaginian adroitness given to his answer, and the unexpected flattery it conveyed, because Hannibal had set him apart from the ordinary run of military captains as an incomparable commander."

Metellus Scipio, a descendant of Scipio, commanded legions against Julius Caesar in Africa until his defeat at the Battle of Thapsus in 49 BC. Popular superstition was that only a Scipio could win a battle in Africa, so Julius Caesar assigned a distant relative of Metellus to his staff in order to say that he too had a Scipio fighting for him.

Political
Scipio was the first Roman general to expand Roman territories outside Italy and islands around the Italian mainland. He conquered the Carthaginian territory of Iberia for Rome, although the two Iberian provinces were not fully pacified for a couple of centuries. His defeat of Hannibal at Zama paved the way for Carthage's eventual destruction in 146 BC. His interest in a Graecophile lifestyle had tremendous influence on the Roman elite; more than a century later, even the conservative Cato Uticensis (great-grandson of the elder Cato) espoused Greek philosophy. 

Scipio did not introduce Greek ideas or art to the Romans, but his ardent support for the Greek way of life coupled with his own charisma had its inevitable impact. Less beneficially, the Scipios may have led the way in the inevitable chasm that grew up between the Roman elite and the Roman masses, in terms of the way the elite was educated and lived and in the amount of wealth they possessed.

Scipio supported land distribution for his veterans in a tradition harking back to the earliest days of the Republic, yet his actions were seen as somewhat radical by conservatives. In being a successful general who demanded lands for his soldiers, Scipio may have led the way for later generals such as Gaius Marius and Julius Caesar. Unlike  Marius or Caesar, however, he did not seek to use his charisma and reputation to weaken the Republic. The true measure of Scipio's character in this regard can perhaps be seen by his behaviour shortly after returning in triumph from Africa to a grateful Rome. Scipio refused to accept demands for him to become perpetual consul and dictator. For his self-restraint in putting the good of the republic ahead of his own gain, Scipio was praised by Livy for showing uncommon greatness of mind—an example conspicuously not emulated by Marius, Sulla or Caesar.

The relatives of Scipio continued to dominate the republic for a couple of generations. This domination came to an end in the tumults between the Gracchi brothers, who were his grandsons, and their other relatives in the period from 133 to 122 BC. The Gracchi brothers championed land redistribution in order to boost the ranks of potential Roman soldiers, as Roman soldiers needed to own land to be enfranchised for service in the legions and the number of Roman land owners was withering. They were lynched by their relatives who disapproved of their methods and perhaps had economic reasons to fear the land redistribution. 

After the fall of the Gracchi, the house of Caecilius became more prominent. However, the Scipiones maintained their aristocratic lustre, providing the consular general who unsuccessfully prevented Sulla's second march on Rome and Metellus Scipio whose daughter was the last wife of Pompey the Great, and who took over command in the civil war against Julius Caesar after the death of Pompey. The granddaughter of Gaius Gracchus, Fulvia, was also unusually prominent for a Roman woman in the affairs of the late republic, marrying Publius Clodius, Gaius Curio and Mark Antony in turn. At a later date, some Roman emperors claimed descent from Scipio Africanus.

Classical literature
Scipio appears or is mentioned in passing in Cicero's De Republica and De Amicitia, and in Silius Italicus' Punica (Cicero was mentored by prominent Romans whose ancestors had been associated with Scipio). As a Roman hero, Scipio appears in Book VI of the Aeneid where he is shown to Aeneas in a vision in the underworld. Scipio figures prominently in Livy's "Ab urbe condita libri" and is named as an example of a warrior at the end of Book III of Lucretius' De rerum natura.

Medieval literature
Scipio is mentioned four times in Dante's Divine Comedy: in "Inferno"—Canto XXXI, in "Purgatorio"—Canto XXIX, and in "Paradiso"—Cantos VI and XXVII.

Renaissance literature and art

Scipio is the hero of Petrarch's Latin epic Africa. 'The Continence [i.e. moderation] of Scipio' was a stock motif in exemplary literature and art, as was the 'Dream of Scipio', portraying his allegorical choice between Virtue and Luxury. The Continence of Scipio, depicting his clemency and sexual restraint after the fall of Carthago Nova, was an even more popular subject. Versions of the subject were painted by many artists from the Renaissance through to the 19th century, including Andrea Mantegna and Nicolas Poussin. 

Scipio is mentioned in Machiavelli's work The Prince (Chapter XVII "Concerning Cruelty And Clemency, And Whether It Is Better To Be Loved Than Feared"). Milton mentions Scipio in Book 9 of Paradise Lost and in Book 3 of Paradise Regained. Raphael's painting Vision of a Knight is thought to be a depiction of Scipio.

Music
Publius Cornelius Scipio was the title character of a number of Italian operas composed during the baroque period of music, including settings by George Frideric Handel, Leonardo Vinci, and Carlo Francesco Pollarolo. The march from Handel's setting, entitled Scipione, remains the regimental slow march of the British Grenadier Guards. Scipio is also referenced in the Italian national anthem.

Film and television
Shortly before Italy's invasion of Ethiopia, Benito Mussolini commissioned an epic film depicting the exploits of Scipio. Scipione l'africano, written by Carmine Gallone, won the Mussolini Cup for the greatest Italian film at the 1937 Venice Film Festival.

In 1971 Luigi Magni scripted and directed the movie Scipione, detto anche l'Africano (Scipio, aka "the African"), starring Marcello Mastroianni, Vittorio Gassman, Silvana Mangano and Woody Strode, in which the historical events are portrayed in a light and satirical mode, with some intentional references to the political events of the time in which the movie was made.

In the 1983 BBC mini-series The Cleopatras, Scipio is portrayed by Geoffrey Whitehead.

In the 2000 film Gladiator, the first battle in the Colosseum is meant to re-enact Scipio Africanus's battle of Zama against Hannibal's barbarian horde. In the film, Maximus ruins the re-enactment by leading the gladiators, who are meant to represent Hannibal's forces, to victory over Scipio's legionaries.

In the 2006 television film Hannibal, he is portrayed by British actor Shaun Dingwall, notably at the battles of Cannae and Zama.

Video games
Scipio features as a playable character, represented by a cataphract, in the Battle of Zama in Age of Empires: The Rise of Rome. He also appears in the Haemimont Games video game Imperivm III: The Great Battles of Rome, Centurion: Defender of Rome, and in the Hannibal at the Gates campaign in Total War: Rome II.
Scipio appears twice as a playable character in the Mobile/PC Game Rise of Kingdoms.

See also
Scipio–Paullus–Gracchus family tree

Notes

References

Primary sources
 Livy, Ab urbe condita libri xxvi, xxviii, xxix
 Orosius, Historiae adversus paganos libri iv
 Valerius Maximus, Factorum ac dictorum memorabilium libri iii, iv, vii, viii

Secondary sources
T.R.S. Broughton, The Magistrates of the Roman Republic (American Philological Association, 1951, 1986).
Theodore Ayrault Dodge, Hannibal, Da Capo Press; Reissue edition, 2004. 
 
 H. H. Scullard, Scipio Africanus: Soldier and Politician, Thames and Hudson, London, 1970. 
 H. H. Scullard, Scipio Africanus in the Second Punic War Thirlwall Prize Essay (University Press, Cambridge, 1930)

 B.H. Liddell Hart, Scipio Africanus: Greater Than Napoleon, W Blackwood and Sons, London, 1926; Biblio and Tannen, New York, 1976. .
 E. Torregaray Pagola, La elaboración de la tradición sobre los Cornelii Scipiones: pasado histórico y conformación simbólica, Fundación Fernando el Católico, Zaragoza, 1998. ISBN 9788478204458.

External links
 
 
 
 
 

230s BC births
183 BC deaths
Year of birth uncertain
3rd-century BC Roman consuls
2nd-century BC Roman consuls
Ancient Roman generals
Characters in Book VI of the Aeneid
Africanus
Priests of the Roman Republic
Roman censors
Roman commanders of the Second Punic War
Roman governors of Hispania
Roman patricians
Roman philhellenes